Rajiv Rathore (born 18 January 1974, also spelt Rajeev Rathore) is an Indian former cricketer. He played 17 List A matches for Delhi between 1998 and 2003.

See also
 List of Delhi cricketers

References

External links
 

1974 births
Living people
Indian cricketers
Delhi cricketers
Cricketers from Delhi
Rajasthan cricket captains